Wang Han (born 24 January 1991) is a retired Chinese diver who specialises in the 1 meter and 3 meter springboard events. Wang won a silver medal in the 1 meter springboard event at the 2011 World Aquatics Championships.

Early life
Wang was born on 24 January 1991 in Baoding, Hebei. At the age of 4, she entered the Baoding Sports Kindergarten and began to practice gymnastics. In 2000, following her selection by the Hebei diving team coach, she began to practice diving.

Sports career
In 2005, Wang won the women's single 10-meter platform diving championship at the Asian Swimming Championships. In 2008, she was selected for the Chinese National Diving Team. In 2010, Wang won the women's synchronized 3-meter springboard championship at the 2010 Asian Games in Guangzhou and in 2013, she won the women's double 3-meter springboard championship in diving at the 12th National Games of China in Liaoning.

In 2015, she won the mixed 3-meter springboard in the diving at the 16th FINA World Championships in Kazan. In 2018, Wang won the women's 1-meter springboard championship at the 18th Asian Games in Jakarta and in 2019, she and Shi Tingmao won the women's synchronized 3-meter springboard championship in diving at the 18th FINA World Aquatics Championships in Gwangju. 

At the 2020 Summer Olympics in Tokyo, Wang and Shi Tingmao won the gold medal in the women's synchronized 3-meter springboard.  In the women's single 3-meter springboard, she won the silver medal.

On 5 April 2022, Wang announced her retirement from international competition. On the same month, she became the coach of the Hebei diving team.

Awards and honours 
On 9 August 2021, the Chinese Communist Youth League and the All-China Youth Federation awarded 39 young athletes, including Wang, the China Youth May Fourth Medal (China Youth Wusi Medal).
On 11 August 2021, the All-China Women's Federation awarded Wang the honor of National March 8 Red Banner Bearer.
On 3 April 2022, Wang was again awarded the China Youth May Fourth Medal by the Chinese Communist Youth League and the All-China Youth Federation on the occasion of the 100th anniversary of the founding of the Youth League.

References

External links

Living people
Chinese female divers
Asian Games medalists in diving
Divers at the 2010 Asian Games
Divers at the 2014 Asian Games
Divers at the 2018 Asian Games
1991 births
World Aquatics Championships medalists in diving
Asian Games gold medalists for China
Asian Games silver medalists for China
Medalists at the 2010 Asian Games
Medalists at the 2014 Asian Games
Medalists at the 2018 Asian Games
Universiade medalists in diving
Universiade gold medalists for China
Sportspeople from Baoding
Medalists at the 2011 Summer Universiade
Olympic gold medalists for China
Olympic silver medalists for China
Medalists at the 2020 Summer Olympics
Olympic medalists in diving
Divers at the 2020 Summer Olympics
Olympic divers of China
21st-century Chinese women